Gašper Krošelj (born 9 February 1987) is a Slovenian ice hockey player for BK Mladá Boleslav of the Czech Extraliga (ELH). 

He participated at the 2015 IIHF World Championship where he picked up one clean sheet. He also competed in the 2018 Winter Olympics. Since the 2018–2019 season he has played for BK Mladá Boleslav. He played 34 match in the adult national team.

References

External links

1987 births
Living people
Slovenian ice hockey goaltenders
Sportspeople from Ljubljana
Ice hockey players at the 2018 Winter Olympics
Olympic ice hockey players of Slovenia
HK Slavija Ljubljana players
KHL Medveščak Zagreb players
HK Acroni Jesenice players
AaB Ishockey players
Herlev Hornets players
Sparta Warriors players
IK Oskarshamn players
AIK IF players
Rødovre Mighty Bulls players
BK Mladá Boleslav players
Slovenian expatriate sportspeople in Slovakia
Slovenian expatriate sportspeople in the Czech Republic
Slovenian expatriate sportspeople in Croatia
Slovenian expatriate sportspeople in Denmark
Slovenian expatriate sportspeople in Norway
Slovenian expatriate sportspeople in Sweden
Expatriate ice hockey players in Slovakia
Expatriate ice hockey players in the Czech Republic
Expatriate ice hockey players in Croatia
Expatriate ice hockey players in Denmark
Expatriate ice hockey players in Norway
Expatriate ice hockey players in Sweden
Slovenian expatriate ice hockey people